Thomas Eyton (c1843 – 14 February 1925) was one of the organisers of the 1888–89 New Zealand Native football team which toured Australia, Britain, and Ireland.

He was a New Zealand Wars veteran, serving from 1863 to 1869 in the Otahuhu Cavalry, Taranaki Bushrangers and Patea Light Horse. He then worked in the Treasury in Wellington for five years, before entering private business.

Born in Essex, England about 1825, he was the son of a Royal Navy lieutenant-commander. Educated in Essex, he was a clerk in Trinity House dealing with lighthouses for two years before deciding on an outdoor life and emigrating to New Zealand in 1862.

He died in Auckland, and is buried in Waikaraka Cemetery.

References
The Encyclopaedia of New Zealand Rugby by Ron Palenski, Rod Chester & Neville McMillan, page 250 (4th edition 2005, Hodder Moa Beckett, Auckland)  

1840s births
1925 deaths
English emigrants to New Zealand
Rugby union people in New Zealand
19th-century New Zealand businesspeople
19th-century New Zealand public servants
People from Essex (before 1965)
People from Auckland